John Allan Seay, Jr. (July 15, 1940 – May 14, 2016) was an American country music singer, professionally known as Johnny Sea or Johnny Seay. His first hits came in the late 1950s, and his career saw a resurgence in the mid-1960s, particularly with the release of his spoken word single "Day For Decision".

Biography
Seay was born in Gulfport, Mississippi, and grew up in Atlanta, and had his first major break in 1957 by winning a state talent show (whose runner-up was Bill Anderson). As a result of this he was offered a recording contract as well as the opportunity to appear on Louisiana Hayride and The Grand Ole Opry. In 1959, he scored a hit on the country charts with "Frankie's Man Johnny", and had a second in 1960 with "Nobody's Darling but Mine". Both his early hits were on NRC Records. After these hits he moved westward to become a cowboy.

In 1964 he began recording again and his songs, "My Baby Walks All Over Me" and "My Old Faded Rose", became country chart successes. Signing with Warner Bros. Records in 1966, he released the song "Day For Decision" which featured a background chorus singing "America". The recording was a country success and also peaked at No. 35 on the US pop charts; it was nominated for a Grammy award but lost to a collection of recordings by Edward R. Murrow. Its accompanying album, which was a minor chart success, featured renditions of several popular patriotic tunes. After 1967, he began recording under his given name Johnny Seay again, and had two more country hits for Columbia Records, "Goin' to Tulsa" and "Three Six Packs, Two Arms and a Juke Box". His 1968 (released in 1970) song "Willie's Drunk and Nellie's Dyin'" were about his real-life neighbors Willie and Nellie York; after the song's release, the family was profiled in Life Magazine (July 17, 1970). Following his second rise to stardom, Seay returned to the life of a cowboy, moving to Justiceburg, Texas.

He died May 14, 2016, when his single-engine plane clipped a cell telephone tower wire and crashed near West, Texas. He was 75.

Discography

Albums

Singles

References

External links
Official website

1940 births
2016 deaths
American country singer-songwriters
Columbia Records artists
Country musicians from Mississippi
National Recording Corporation artists
Philips Records artists
Singer-songwriters from Mississippi
Warner Records artists